The 2004 Ohio Bobcats football team represented Ohio University during the 2004 NCAA Division I-A football season. Ohio competed as a member of the Mid-American Conference (MAC). The Bobcats were led by fourth year head coach Brian Knorr, who was fired after the end of the season.  They played their home games in Peden Stadium in Athens, Ohio.

Schedule

References

Ohio
Ohio Bobcats football seasons
Ohio Bobcats football